Chelgate Limited is an independent international public relations and public affairs consultancy founded by Terence Fane-Saunders in 1988. The firm's headquarters are located in London with offices in Brussels, Belgium and Bucharest, Romania.

Background
Terence Fane-Saunders is a leader in international public relations professionals. Before founding Chelgate, he was chairman and chief executive of Burson-Marsteller in the UK, and before that, Executive Vice President, International and a member of the world board of Hill & Knowlton Inc, based in New York City. Previously, Fane-Saunders worked in the Far East, based in Hong Kong, and was responsible for the establishment of the first public relations consultancy in the People's Republic of China. In late 2013, Spear's Magazine – a publication targeted at UK-based ultra-high-net-worth individuals – listed Fane-Saunders as one of the UK's top ten reputation management PR experts, calling him "a heavyweight... and a reputation manager with a pedigree".

Although operating as a "full service" PR consultancy providing the normal range of services, Chelgate is recognised for its expertise in issues and crisis management. The firm's client list remains confidential. However it is a matter of record that Chelgate assisted Shell Oil Company with its Brent Spa and Nigeria (Ken Saro-Wiwa) issues, and Mitsubishi Corporation with environmental issues, including deforestation. The firm also ran a global campaign against Zimbabwe dictator Robert Mugabe ("Save Zimbabwe"), resulting in hardening of international opinion against that regime. It was also visible during the negotiations between the Duke of Sutherland and the National Galleries of Scotland over the £100 million sale of two Titians on loan to the Galleries, with Terence Fane-Saunders acting as spokesman for the Duke. Since 2008 Chelgate has worked with the insurer Hiscox to provide crisis containment and communications support to management liability and other groups of policyholders in any claim or the likelihood of an insured event with a risk to reputation. Similar arrangements have subsequently been made with AXA Insurance and ARAG Group.

Chelgate is also known to be active in environment-related PR. Deputy chairman Nick Wood-Dow, who heads the firm's environment division, is also founder of the Tory Green Initiative, and deputy chair of The Environment Council. Other areas include education, property, construction, energy and utilities, gambling, broadcasting, art and culture, technology, transport, planning and professional services, whilst a political relations unit provides specialist public affairs services.

Chelgate opened an office in Bucharest, Romania, in 2006, and was one of a handful of Western public relations firms operating in the country when it became a member of the EU in 2007. Chelgate's first public relations contract was handling communications for the European Commission in the run-up to accession, and Romania's early years as a member state. The European Commission remain a client today.

Chelgate has operated a Brussels office since 1994, specifically for work covering the European Commission and European Parliament.

Notable issues

Zimbabwe 
The Save Zimbabwe campaign  promoted democracy in the country, and was orchestrated by Chelgate from London and South Africa. Although there is now some power sharing, the country still remains under the rule of President Robert Mugabe, as it has done for the past three decades.

Education and the internet 
In 1996, an industry-led initiative was launched to encourage schools to use the internet for education purposes. Backed by then Prime Minister Tony Blair, and led by Cisco Systems, Sun Microsystems, ICL Fujitsu and The Daily Telegraph, the year-long initiative (1997) signed up some 10,000 schools. Chelgate was the public relations project director, leading a team of six public relations agencies and consultancies across the UK. The launch of the initiative involved the second webcast ever in the UK, and included a joint launch (linked by satellite) in London, Glasgow, Belfast and Cardiff, together with simultaneous events in 23 schools around the country.

Gas market deregulation 
Chelgate worked for British Gas throughout the deregulation of the commercial and domestic gas supply markets in the UK during the 1990s, the only time the firm has had to manage the reputational consequences of a client deliberately losing a significant share of its market. Chelgate also promoted the use of gas as a road fuel and was instrumental in securing a reduction in taxes for road fuel gases, a differential still in existence today.

Cable television 
Chelgate worked with CableTel when it first came to the UK and bid for its initial licences in Surrey, Luton, West Yorkshire, Glasgow and South Wales, later assisting with further bids in Northern Ireland. CableTel subsequently adopted its parent company name, NTL when it acquired numerous existing licences around the UK, becoming the UK's only cable provider, now rebranded as Virgin Media.

Examination boards 
The early 1990s saw the deregulation of the examination boards, with a level of consolidation in the market. Chelgate worked with the Oxford, Cambridge, and RSA Examinations, creating a new brand in the industry, OCR. Over the following years the firm was involved in numerous acute issues – "falling standards", lost/late papers, and marking inconsistencies.

Notable assignments

Church Commissioners 
Terence Fane-Saunders advised the Church of England in 2010 in their ‘secret plot’ to sell some of their greatest paintings. The Daily Mail reported that Mr. Fane-Saunders suggested that bad publicity could be minimised if a ‘friendly’ arts journalist could be briefed. He also advised the Church Commissioners that Chelgate’s role in advising the Church should be kept secret.

The former Bishop of Durham N. T. Wright denounced the move as ‘sneaky’. When asked by Helen Goodman MP, the Church Commissioners refused to elaborate on how much Chelgate had been paid.

Planning 
Chelgate was one of the leaders in communications surrounding planning applications. However, by 2018 Michael Gove, the Secretary of State for Environment, Food, and Rural Affairs, was criticizing the firm for lack of transparency in planning issues.

References

External links 
 Official Chelgate website
 Chelgate Bucharest website
 Chelgate Brussels website
 Construction Manager Legal update article about localism and planning reform January 2011
 New Law Journal Article entitled The Power of PR, July 2010
 Housebuilder Magazine Article about the forthcoming Tory Green Paper on planning, October 2009

Public relations companies of the United Kingdom
Marketing companies established in 1988
Reputation management companies